Andaṛ is a town in the Andar District of Ghazni Province, Afghanistan. It is named after the Andar Ghilji tribe of the Pashtuns.

Notable people
Azad Khan Afghan
Abdul Ahad Mohmand

See also
 Ghazni Province

References

Populated places in Ghazni Province